C. polymorpha may refer to:

 Callyspongia polymorpha, a demosponge first described in 1984
 Canna polymorpha, a garden plant
 Capparis polymorpha, a climbing shrub
 Carex polymorpha, a true sedge
 Ceratomyxa polymorpha, a myxosporean parasite
 Chlumetia polymorpha, an owlet moth
 Coniochaeta polymorpha, a pleomorphic yeast
 Coprosma polymorpha, a plant found on the South Island
 Crepis polymorpha, a hawk's-beard native to eastern and southern Europe
 Cucurbita polymorpha, a plant used in traditional Native American medicine
 Cunninghamella polymorpha, a pin mold